Citadel Peaks is a mountain ridge located in the Goat Haunt area of Glacier National Park, in Glacier County of the U.S. state of Montana. This arête with a row of sharp points is part of the Livingston Range, and is approximately four miles east of the Continental Divide. Neighbors include Olson Mountain,  to the north, Mount Cleveland  to the east, and Kootenai Peak  to the south. Precipitation runoff from the mountain drains to the south end of Waterton Lake. The first ascent of Citadel Spire, a major pinnacle on the ridge, was made in 1967 by Jerry Kanzler, Jim Kanzler, Ray Martin, and Clare Pogreba. This geographical feature's name was officially adopted in 1929 by the United States Board on Geographic Names. To the Pikuni people, Citadel Peaks is known as "Ataniawxis", meaning "The Needles".

Climate

Based on the Köppen climate classification, Citadel Peaks is located in an alpine subarctic climate zone characterized by long, usually very cold winters, and short, cool to mild summers. Temperatures can drop below −10 °F with wind chill factors below −30 °F.

Geology

Like the mountains in Glacier National Park, Citadel Peaks is composed of sedimentary rock laid down during the Precambrian to Jurassic periods.

Gallery

See also

 List of mountains and mountain ranges of Glacier National Park (U.S.)
 Geology of the Rocky Mountains

References

External links
 Weather forecast: Citadel Peaks
 National Park Service web site: Glacier National Park

Livingston Range
Mountains of Glacier County, Montana
Mountains of Glacier National Park (U.S.)
Mountains of Montana
North American 2000 m summits